Ajoy is a given name. Notable people with the name including :

Ajoy Biswas, Indian politician
Ajoy Bose (born 1952), Bengali-Indian author and political journalist
Ajoy Chakrabarty (born 1953), Indian classical singer
Ajoy Das (born 1976), Indian cricketer
Ajoy Dasgupta (born 1950), Bangladeshi journalist, writer, lecturer, and freedom fighter
Ajoy Dey (1952–2021), Indian politician
Ajoy Ghatak, Indian physicist and author
Ajoy Ghose, Director of the Indian School of Mines University in Dhanbad, India
Ajoy Ghosh (1909–1962), prominent leader of the Communist Party of India
Ajoy Home (1913–1992), Bengali aviculturist, ornithologist, and naturalist
Ajoy Kar (1914–1985), Indian film director and cinematographer
Ajoy Kumar (born 1964), Indian Police Service officer
Ajoy Kumar Dutta, Indian social worker
Ajoy Mehta, Indian politician
Ajoy Mukherjee (1901–1986), the fourth chief minister of West Bengal, India
Ajoy Mukhopadhyay (1928–2019), Indian politician
Ajoy Nath Ray (born 1946), Indian judge
Ajoy Roy (1935–2019), retired Professor of Physics at the Dhaka University of Bangladesh
Ajoy Sarkar (born 1997), Indian cricketer

See also
All India Kisan Sabha (Ajoy Bhavan), the peasant or farmers' wing of the Communist Party of India